Rudná may refer to:

Rudná (Prague-West District), a town in the Central Bohemian Region, Czech Republic 
Rudná (Svitavy District), a municipality and village in the Pardubice Region, Czech Republic
Rudná pod Pradědem, a municipality and village in the Moravian-Silesian Region, Czech Republic
Rudná, Rožňava District, a municipality and village in Slovakia

See also
Rudna (disambiguation)
Ruda (disambiguation)
Rudny (disambiguation)